The legislature of the U.S. state of Virginia has convened many times since statehood became effective on June 25, 1788.

Legislatures
 1st (1776)
 2nd (1777–78)
 3rd (1778)
 4th (1779)
 5th (1780–81)
 6th (1781–82)
 7th (1782)
 8th (1783)
 9th (1784–85)
 10th (1785–86)
 11th (1786–87)
 12th (1787–88)
 13th (1788)
 14th (1789)
 15th (1790)
 16th (1791)
 17th (1792)
 18th (1793)
 19th (1794)
 20th (1795)
 21st (1796)
 22nd (1797–98)
 23rd (1798–99)
 24th (1799–1800)
 25th (1800–01)
 26th (1801–02)
 27th (1802–03)
 28th (1803–04)
 29th (1804–05)
 30th (1805–06)
 31st (1806–07)
 32nd (1807–08)
 33rd (1808–09)
 34th (1809–10)
 35th (1810–11)
 36th (1811–12)
 37th (1812–13)
 38th (1813–14)
 39th (1814–15)
 40th (1815–16)
 41st (1816–17)
 42nd (1817–18)
 43rd (1818–19)
 44th (1819–20)
 45th (1820–21)
 46th (1821–22)
 47th (1822–23)
 48th (1823–24)
 49th (1824–25)
 50th (1825–26)
 51st (1826–27)
 52nd (1827–28)
 53rd (1828–29)
 54th (1829–30)
 55th (1830–31)
 56th (1831–32)
 57th (1832–33)
 58th (1833–34)
 59th (1834–35)
 60th (1835–36)
 61st (1836–37)
 62nd (1838)
 63rd (1839)
 64th (1839–40)
 65th (1840–41)
 66th (1841–42)
 67th (1842–43)
 68th (1843–44)
 69th (1844–45)
 70th (1845–46)
 71st (1846–47)
 72nd (1847–48)
 73rd (1848–49)
 74th (1849–50)
 75th (1850–51)
 76th (1852–53)
 77th (1853–54)
 78th (1855–56)
 79th (1857–58)
 80th (1859–61)
 81st (1861–63)
 82nd (1863–65)
 83rd (1865)
 84th (1865–67)
 85th (1869–71)
 86th (1871–73)
 87th (1874–75)
 88th (1875–77)
 89th (1877–79)
 90th (1879–80)
 91st (1881–82)
 92nd (1883–84)
 93rd (1885–87)
 94th (1887–88)
 95th (1889–90)
 96th (1891–92)
 97th (1893–94)
 98th (1895–96)
 99th (1897–98)
 100th (1899–1900)
 101st (1901)
 102nd (1901–04)
 103rd (1904)
 104th (1906)
 105th (1908)
 106th (1910)
 107th (1912)
 108th (1914–15)
 109th (1916)
 110th (1918–19)
 111th  (1920)
 112th (1922–23)
 113th (1924)
 114th (1926–27)
 115th (1928)
 116th (1930)
 117th (1932–33)
 118th (1934)
 119th (1936–37)
 120th (1938)
 121st (1940)
 122nd (1942)
 123rd (1944–45)
 124th (1946–47)
 125th (1948)
 126th (1950)
 127th (1952)
 128th (1954–55)
 129th (1956)
 130th (1958–59)
 131st (1960)
 132nd (1962–63)
 133rd (1964–65)
 134th (1966)
 135th (1968–69)
 136th (1970–71)
 137th (1972–73)
 138th (1974–75)
 139th (1976–77)
 140th (1978–79)
 141st (1980–81)
 142nd (1982–83)
 143rd (1984–85)
 144th (1986–87)
 145th (1988–89)
 146th (1990–91)
 147th (1992–93)
 148th (1994–95)
 149th (1996–97)
 150th (1998–99)
 151st (2000–01)
 152nd (2002–03)
 153rd (2004–05)
 154th (2006–07)
 155th (2008–09)
 156th (January 13 to March 13, 2010 and January 12-February 27,  April 6, June 9-July 29, 2011)
 157th (January 11-March 10, 2012 and January 9-February 25, 2013)
 158th (January 8-March 10, 2014 and January 14-February 28, 2015)
 159th (January 13-March 11, 2016 and January 11-February 25, 2017)
 160th (January 10-March 10, 2018 and January 9-February 24, 2019)
 161st (January 8-March 12, 2020 and January 13-February 8, 2021)
 162nd (January 12, 2022-present)

See also
 List of speakers of the Virginia House of Delegates
 List of governors of Virginia
 History of Virginia

References

Further reading

External links
 Virginia General Assembly. Members and Session
 Commonwealth of Virginia. Reports to the General Assembly
 Secretary of the Commonwealth of Virginia. Bluebooks, 2005-2017
 

Legislatures
Legislature
 
Virginia